Ryszard Pędrak-Janowicz (17 May 1932, in Lwów – 1 February 2004, in Kraków) is a Polish luger who competed from the mid-1950s to the mid-1960s. He won a complete set of medals at the FIL World Luge Championships with a gold in the men's doubles (1963), a silver in the men's singles (1958) and a bronze in the men's doubles event (1958).

Pędrak-Janowicz competed in the 1964 Winter Olympics where he finished tied for fifth in the men's doubles event.

References
 Hickok sports information on World champions in luge and skeleton.
 Wallechinsky, David. (1984). "Luge – Men's singles". The Complete Book of the Olympics: 1896–1980. New York: Penguin Books. p. 576.

1932 births
2004 deaths
Lugers at the 1964 Winter Olympics
Polish male lugers
Olympic lugers of Poland
Sportspeople from Lviv
20th-century Polish people